State Road 24 (SR 24) is an east–west state highway that runs between Cedar Key on the Gulf of Mexico and Waldo, Florida, at US 301. State Road 24 runs along a former branch of the Seaboard Air Line Railroad. This branch was originally owned by the Florida Railway and Navigation Company, and used to lead to ferries to both Pensacola, Florida and New Orleans, Louisiana. It also passes through Rosewood, site of the infamous 1923 massacre.

Route description

Levy County

Starting as D Street in Cedar Key, State Road 24 skips over Jackson Island and Sunset Island before making its way across the mainland of northwestern Florida. In the City of Otter Creek, the road intersects US 19-98, at a blinker light, which hardly looks like a city at all.

Between US 19-98 and Alternate US 27 in Bronson, the road runs through a wooded area north of Goethe State Forest.

Names for State Road 24 in Levy County include D-Street, 2nd Avenue, West Thrasher Drive, East Thrasher Drive and SR 24.

Alachua County
Shortly after crossing the Levy-Alachua County Line, SR 24 becomes Archer Road and enters Archer itself, intersecting with US 27-41. After the interchange with Interstate 75 in Gainesville, State Road 24 crosses SR 121, where it runs along the south side of the University of Florida then become concurrent with US 441, later with SR 20/26(West University Avenue), until the intersection with SR 331(Southeast Williston Road), where it breaks off onto Northeast Waldo Road, which are also overlapped with US Truck Route 441 and State Truck Route 121 until the intersection with SR 222. The Northeast corner of SR 24 and SR 222 is the site of the Gainesville Regional Airport, while the rest of the road runs through the University of Florida Austin Carey Forest before finally terminating at an interchange with US 301  in Waldo.

Names for State Road 24 in Alachua County include SR 24, Southwest Archer Road, Southwest 13th Street, West University Avenue, Northeast Waldo Road, Kennard Street (Westbound lanes in Waldo), and Waldo Road (Eastbound lanes in Waldo).

Major intersections

Related routes

State Road 24A

State Road 24A (SR 24A) is an alternate route within Gainesville. It is overlapped by State Road 226 (Southwest 16th Avenue and Southeast 16th Avenue), and then State Road 331 from SR 226 to SR 20/26, where it terminates at SR 24 again.

The west end of SRs 24A/226 is only accessible eastbound from SR 24 and westbound to SR 24. Motorists who want to travel in the opposite direction must use nearby Shealy Drive. At US 441 the road transforms from a four-lane divided highway to a four-lane undivided highway with a continuous left-turn lane.  The divider returns again east of Southwest 10th Avenue, but ends east of Southwest 6th Street. SR 24A-226 runs along Southwest 16th Avenue, and becomes Southeast 16th Avenue, when it crosses SR 329 and narrows down to two lanes.

The road curves down to a southbound direction and has frequent pedestrian crosswalks across it before curving back east. SR 226 ends at SR 331, however SR 24A continues north along SR 331 until it reaches the intersection of SR 20-24-26.

County Road 24

County Road 24 is a short county road spur of SR 24 in Bronson.

State Road 24 Truck

Florida State Truck Route 24 in Gainesville, Florida was established  in order to divert trucks form the congested downtown areas of Gainesville. The route begins at the Interstate 75 at Exit 384, and follows that route south, having also joined Truck Route 26 which ran southbound along I-75 since Exit 387. Both routes follow the interstate until leaving at Exit 382 to make an easterly turn onto a new overlap with State Road 121. One block after the interstate, the two truck routes encounter the southern terminus of Florida State Road 331, and SR 121 makes a sharp left turn, while Truck Routes 24 and 26 join SR 331 in an overlap are joined by Florida State Truck Route 121. At the intersection with U.S. Route 441, the routes are joined by a truck route of that route as well. The four truck routes run northeast along SR 331 past the eastern terminus of Florida State Road 226, and are also joined by another overlap, this time with Florida State Road 24A. This makes a total of five overlapping routes with SR 331, which curves from northeast to the north. Florida State Truck Route 24/SR 24A/Truck Route 26/SR 331 terminates at the east end of the overlap of SRs 20, 24, and 26. However US 441 Truck and Florida Truck Route 121 continue to the northeast along SR 24 until reaching their respected parent routes.

References

External links

Florida Route Log (SRs 24 and 24A)
Florida Route Log (SR 226)

024
024
024
024
1945 establishments in Florida